Jacob Larsson (born 29 April 1997) is a Swedish professional ice hockey defenseman currently playing with the Belleville Senators in the American Hockey League (AHL) while under contract to the Ottawa Senators of the National Hockey League (NHL). He was selected 27th overall by the Anaheim Ducks in the 2015 NHL Entry Draft.

Playing career 
Larsson split the 2014–15 season between Frölunda HC's professional and junior teams. At season's end, he was the third-ranked international skater in the NHL Central Scouting Bureau's final rankings. At the 2015 NHL Entry Draft, Larsson was selected 27th overall by the Anaheim Ducks.

He returned to Frölunda for the 2015–16 season. In 47 games, Larsson recorded 5 goals and 9 assists for 14 points. He had 3 assists in 16 postseason games as Frölunda captured the Le Mat Trophy. Additionally, the team also won the Champions Hockey League (CHL) Championship, where Larsson contributed 5 points in 13 games. On 28 April 2016, he signed an amateur try-out with the Ducks' American Hockey League (AHL) affiliate, the San Diego Gulls. He appeared in one playoff game for the club.

On 20 May 2016, the Ducks signed Larsson to a three-year, entry-level contract. He made his NHL debut on 13 October 2016, going scoreless in a 4–2 loss to the Dallas Stars. On 22 October, the Ducks assigned Larsson to the Gulls after 4 games. On 3 November, the Ducks reassigned Larsson to Frölunda. The team once again won the CHL Championship. Larsson returned to North America for the 2017–18 season, playing entirely for the Gulls. He recorded 16 points in 50 games.

On 7 November 2018, Larsson recorded his first career NHL point (an assist) in a 3–2 win over the Calgary Flames. He split the 2018–19 season between the Ducks and Gulls, primarily skating with Anaheim.

In the following  2019–20 season, on 5 November 2019, Larsson scored his first career NHL goal in a 4–2 loss to the Minnesota Wild. He finished with 2 goals and 9 assists for 11 points in 60 games before the regular season was halted due to the COVID-19 pandemic.

On 6 August 2020, the Ducks signed Larsson to a two-year contract extension. With the 2020–21 North American season delayed due to the COVID-19 pandemic, Larsson in order to recommence playing signed on loan with Allsvenskan club, Kristianstads IK, on 23 October 2020.

On July 14, 2022, having left the Ducks as a free agent following six seasons, Larsson was signed to a one-year, two-way contract with the Ottawa Senators.

Career statistics

Regular season and playoffs

International

Awards and honors

References

External links 

1997 births
Anaheim Ducks draft picks
Anaheim Ducks players
Belleville Senators players
Frölunda HC players
Kristianstads IK players
Living people
National Hockey League first-round draft picks
Ottawa Senators players
People from Ljungby Municipality
San Diego Gulls (AHL) players
Swedish ice hockey defencemen
Sportspeople from Kronoberg County